Ahi Acre is an Israeli football club based in the Old City of Acre. The club is currently in Liga Bet North A division and play at the Acre Municipal Stadium.

History
The club was founded in 2003 and joined Liga Gimel Western Galilee (now defunct) in the 2003–04 season, after the previous club from the Old City of Acre, Hapoel Bnei Acre, dissolved after it was last active in the previous season.

In the 2006–07 season, the club won Liga Gimel Upper Galilee division, and were promoted to Liga Bet. In the 2009–10 season, the club won Liga Bet North A division and were promoted to Liga Alef. In their first season in Liga Alef North division, Ahi Acre narrowly avoided the Relegation play-offs, after they finished eleventh. However, in the following season, they finished bottom, after winning only three games and relegated back to Liga Bet, where they play today.

Honours

League

Cups

External links
Ahi Acre Israel Football Association

References

Acre
Association football clubs established in 2003
2003 establishments in Israel
Sport in Acre, Israel
Arab-Israeli football clubs